The Matchworld Cup was an annual international exhibition football club competition hosted by the United Arab Emirates since 2011 till 2013. The winners were Al-Hilal in 2011, Zenit St. Petersburg in 2012, Shakhtar Donetsk in 2013.

The 2011 and 2012 competitions were held in Dubai, and the 2013 competition was held in Abu Dhabi's Zayed Sports City Stadium. The competition is organised by Matchworld Group Switzerland, Matchworld Football SA Sports Management Saudi Arabia, and Sportlive Russia.

Results

2011

Group stage

Group A

Group B

Ranking matches

5th place

3rd place

Final

2012

Group stage

Group A

Group B

Ranking matches

7th place

5th place

3rd place

Final

2013

Final standings

All times are local (UTC+4).

Matches

Performances by team

See also
 Dubai Cup
 Super Cup of Champions
 Dubai Challenge Cup
 United Tournament

References

External links
Matchworld Cup
Matchworld Cup

 
Emirati football friendly trophies
Recurring sporting events established in 2011
Recurring sporting events disestablished in 2013
2011 establishments in the United Arab Emirates
2013 disestablishments in the United Arab Emirates